"Amongst the Waves" is a song by the American rock band Pearl Jam. Featuring music written by guitarist Stone Gossard and lyrics written by vocalist Eddie Vedder, "Amongst the Waves" was released on June 21, 2010, as the third single from the band's ninth studio album, Backspacer (2009). It was released on May 17, 2010, to radio. The song reached number seventeen on the Billboard Alternative Songs chart. A music video for the track was released in June 2010.

Track listing
All lyrics written by Eddie Vedder.
"Amongst the Waves" (Music: Stone Gossard) – 3:58
"The End" (Music: Vedder) – 2:55

Charts

References

External links

2010 singles
Pearl Jam songs
Songs written by Eddie Vedder
Songs written by Stone Gossard
Song recordings produced by Brendan O'Brien (record producer)
Universal Music Group singles
2009 songs
Monkeywrench Records singles